Henriette Woering (born 18 January 1992) is a Dutch professional racing cyclist. She rides for Team Rytger. Her twin sister, Melanie Woering, also rides for Team Rytger.

See also
 List of 2015 UCI Women's Teams and riders

References

External links

1992 births
Living people
Dutch female cyclists
Place of birth missing (living people)
Dutch twins
Twin sportspeople
20th-century Dutch women
21st-century Dutch women
People from Assen
Cyclists from Drenthe